Empis rustica  is a species of fly in the family Empididae. It is included in the subgenus Leptempis. It is found in the  Palearctic.

References

Empis
Insects described in 1798
Asilomorph flies of Europe